The 1928 Colorado gubernatorial election was held on November 6, 1928. Incumbent Democrat Billy Adams defeated Republican nominee William L. Boatright with 67.05% of the vote.

Primary elections
Primary elections were held on September 11, 1928.

Democratic primary

Candidates
Billy Adams, incumbent Governor

Results

Republican primary

Candidates
William L. Boatright, Colorado Attorney General
Clarence P. Dodge, Newspaper publisher

Results

General election

Candidates
Major party candidates
Billy Adams, Democratic
William L. Boatright, Republican

Other candidates
Samuel A. Garth, Socialist
Vera Jane Pease, Farmer–Labor
George J. Saul, Workers

Results

References

1928
Colorado
Gubernatorial
Colorado gubernatorial election